SS Arthur J. Tyrer was a Liberty ship built in the United States during World War II. She was named after Arthur J. Tyrer, a supervising inspector general for the Steamboat Inspection Service and a founding member of the Bureau of Navigation in 1903.

Construction
Arthur J. Tyrer was laid down on 13 July 1944, under a Maritime Commission (MARCOM) contract, MC hull 2372, by J.A. Jones Construction, Brunswick, Georgia; she was sponsored by Mrs. H.D. Ussery, and launched on 22 August 1944.

History
She was allocated to Grace Line, on 31 August 1944. On 15 April 1948, she was laid up in the National Defense Reserve Fleet in Wilmington, North Carolina. On 23 April 1953, she was laid up in the National Defense Reserve Fleet in the James River Group, Lee Hall, Virginia. On 25 June 1953, she was withdrawn from the fleet to be loaded with grain under the "Grain Program 1953". She returned to the fleet loaded with grain on 16 July 1953. She was withdrawn from the fleet on 13 June 1956, to have the grain unloaded and returned empty on 26 July 1956. On 22 July 1958, she was withdrawn from the fleet to be loaded with grain under the "Grain Program 1958", she returned loaded with grain on 6 August 1956. She was withdrawn from the fleet on 2 February 1960, to have the grain unloaded and returned empty on 5 February 1960. On 21 October 1961, she was withdrawn from the fleet to be loaded with grain under the "Grain Program 1960", she returned loaded with grain on 31 October 1960. She was withdrawn from the fleet on 4 February 1963, to have the grain unloaded and returned empty on 9 February 1963. On 19 November 1971, she was sold, along with five other ships, for $433,200, to N.V. Intershitra, Rotterdam, for scrapping. She was removed from the fleet on 8 March 1972.

References

Bibliography

 
 
 
 
 

 

Liberty ships
Ships built in Brunswick, Georgia
1944 ships
Wilmington Reserve Fleet
James River Reserve Fleet
James River Reserve Fleet Grain Program